Free City of Trieste may refer to: 

 Imperial Free City of Trieste (1382–1809, 1849–1922), a free city of the Holy Roman Empire and later Austro-Hungarian Empire
 Free Territory of Trieste (1947–1955), a sovereign state of the early Cold War, finally divided between Italy and Yugoslavia